Svitlana Serbina (born May 2, 1980) is a female diver from Ukraine, who twice represented her native country at the Summer Olympics: 1996 and 2000. She claimed the gold medal in the women's 3 m synchronized springboard competition at the 1998 World Aquatics Championships in Perth, Western Australia, alongside Olena Zhupina.

References
sports-reference

1980 births
Ukrainian female divers
Living people
Divers at the 1996 Summer Olympics
Divers at the 2000 Summer Olympics
Olympic divers of Ukraine
World Aquatics Championships medalists in diving
21st-century Ukrainian women